Mopiopia is a genus of jumping spiders that was first described by Eugène Louis Simon in 1902.

Species
 it contains eight species, found only in Brazil and on the Greater Antilles:
Mopiopia albibarbis (Mello-Leitão, 1947) – Brazil
Mopiopia bruneti (Simon, 1903) – Brazil
Mopiopia comatula Simon, 1902 (type) – Brazil
Mopiopia gounellei (Simon, 1902) – Brazil
Mopiopia labyrinthea (Mello-Leitão, 1947) – Brazil
Mopiopia maculata (Franganillo, 1930) – Cuba
Mopiopia mutica (Simon, 1903) – Brazil
Mopiopia tristis (Mello-Leitão, 1947) – Brazil

References

Salticidae genera
Salticidae
Spiders of Brazil
Spiders of North America